Tiago Mota may refer to:

 Tiago José Bico Mota (born 1985), Portuguese football player, midfielder
 Tiago André Ramos da Mota (born 1987), Portuguese football player, goalkeeper